The 102nd Indiana Infantry Regiment served in the Union Army between July 10 and 17, 1863, during the American Civil War.

Service 
The regiment was organized in Indianapolis, Indiana on July 10, 1863, to repel Morgan's Raid. Morgan's Raid so-called after Confederate General John Hunt Morgan who, with his troops, rained terror and destruction throughout Indiana. The regiment saw duty at Vernon, Dupont, Osgood and Sauman's Station, and on July 17, 1863, the regiment was mustered out.

See also
 List of Indiana Civil War regiments

References

Bibliography 
 Dyer, Frederick H. (1959). A Compendium of the War of the Rebellion. New York and London. Thomas Yoseloff, Publisher. .

Units and formations of the Union Army from Indiana
1863 establishments in Indiana
Military units and formations established in 1863
Military units and formations disestablished in 1863